SM UB-10 was a German Type UB I submarine or U-boat in the German Imperial Navy during World War I.

UB-10 was ordered in October 1914 and was laid down at the AG Weser shipyard in Bremen in November. She carried two torpedoes for her two bow torpedo tubes and was also armed with a deck-mounted machine gun. UB-10 was broken into sections and shipped by rail to Antwerp for reassembly. She was launched in February 1915 and commissioned as SM UB-10 in March. The U-boat was the first of her class to commence operations when she entered service on 27 March 1915.

UB-10 was the first boat assigned to the Flanders Flotilla, the unit in which she spent her entire career. Her first two commanders were Otto Steinbrinck and Reinhold Saltzwedel, fifth and eleventh, respectively, among the top-scoring German submarine commanders of the war. UB-10 was credited with sinking 37 ships, about two-thirds of them British fishing vessels. The first ship sunk, the neutral Dutch steamer , provoked outrage in the Netherlands and helped turn Dutch public opinion against Germany. That sinking was also the impetus behind a renewed effort to avoid attacking neutral ships by U-boats. In a 13-day span in July and August 1915, UB-10 sank 23 ships, and by herself accounted for nearly all of the tonnage sunk by the Flanders Flotilla in the latter month. She was also responsible for sinking the British destroyer  in August 1916. UB-10 had two close calls with British submarines near the Schouwen Bank off Zeebrugge in 1916 and 1917, but survived both.

By 1918, UB-10 had been converted into a minelayer by the replacement of her torpedo tubes with four mine chutes. UB-10 was seriously damaged in a British air raid on Flanders in July 1918, and was decommissioned in September 1918 in a worn out condition. She was not deemed seaworthy to sail to Germany when the bases in Flanders were being evacuated by the Germans in October 1918 and was scuttled off Zeebrugge in early October.

Design and construction 
After the German Army's rapid advance along the North Sea coast in the earliest stages of World War I, the German Imperial Navy found itself without suitable submarines that could be operated in the narrow and shallow seas off Flanders. Project 34, a design effort begun in mid-August 1914, produced the Type UB I design: a small submarine that could be shipped by rail to a port of operations and quickly assembled.

UB-10 was part of the initial allotment of seven submarines—numbered  to —ordered on 15 October from AG Weser of Bremen, just shy of two months after planning for the class began. UB-10 was laid down by Weser in Bremen on 7 November. She had a single  Körting 4-cylinder diesel engine for surface travel, and a single  Siemens-Schuckert double-acting electric motor for underwater travel, both attached to a single propeller shaft.

UB-10 was armed with two  torpedoes in two bow torpedo tubes. She was also outfitted for a single  machine gun on deck. UB-10s standard complement consisted of one officer and thirteen enlisted men.

After work on UB-10 was complete at the Weser yard, she was readied for rail shipment. The process of shipping a UB I boat involved breaking the submarine down into what was essentially a knock down kit. Each boat was broken into approximately fifteen pieces and loaded onto eight railway flatcars. In early 1915, the sections of UB-10 were shipped to Antwerp for assembly in what was typically a two- to three-week process. After UB-10 was assembled and launched on 20 February, she was loaded on a barge and taken through canals to Bruges where she underwent trials.

Early career 
The submarine was commissioned into the German Imperial Navy as SM UB-10 on 15 March 1915 under the command of Oberleutnant zur See (Oblt.z.S.) On 27 March, UB-10 became the first UB I boat to begin operations, and the first U-boat attached to the Flanders Flotilla when it was organized on 29 March. When UB-10 began operations, Germany was in the midst of its first submarine offensive, begun in February. During this campaign, enemy vessels in the German-defined war zone, which encompassed all waters around the United Kingdom, were to be sunk. Vessels of neutral countries were not to be attacked unless they definitively could be identified as enemy vessels operating under a false flag.

The UB I boats of the Flanders Flotilla were initially limited to patrols in the Hoofden, the southern portion of the North Sea between the United Kingdom and the Netherlands.  made the first sortie of the flotilla on 9 April, and UB-10 departed on her first patrol soon after. Although no one was killed in the attack, the attack on a neutral ship sailing between neutral ports—Katwijk was sailing from Rotterdam to Baltimore—provoked outrage among the Dutch population. The sinking of Katwijk and other Dutch ships sharply turned public opinion in the Netherlands against Germany. As a direct result of UB-10s sinking of Katwijk, and to avoid further provoking the Dutch or other neutrals (primarily the United States), the German government issued an order on 18 April that no neutral vessels were to be attacked. The German government later paid compensation for the sinking of Katwijk.

It was early June before UB-10 sank her next ship. The Belgian ship Menapier, carrying a load of iron ore from Algiers for Middlesbrough, was torpedoed and sunk off North Foreland by Steinbrinck on the 7th. Of the 23 persons on board the 1,886-ton ship, only 6 were saved. Menapiers master, his wife, and six-year-old daughter, the first mate, the pilot, and 12 other crewmen perished.

After UB-10s sister boat  pioneered a route through British anti-submarine nets and mines in the Straits of Dover on 21 and 22 June, boats of the flotilla began to patrol into the English Channel. Even though none of the boats sank any ships, by successfully completing their voyages, they helped further prove the feasibility of defeating the British countermeasures in the Straits of Dover.

All eight of the sunken ships were smacks—sailing vessels traditionally rigged with red ochre sails—which were stopped, boarded by crewmen from UB-10, and sunk with explosives.

August 1915 

UB-10 began August 1915 by capturing and burning Alert—another British fishing smack—off Lowestoft on the 1st. The same day, Fulgens, a 2,512-ton collier, was torpedoed one nautical mile (1.8 km) from Palling; the crew of the ship—UB-10s largest victim to-date—were all saved.

On 8 August, UB-10 captured and sank two more smacks—Arbor Vitae and Xmas Rose—off Lowestoft, and followed that up by sinking the largest ship of her career two days later. The  Rosalie, headed from North Shields for San Francisco, was torpedoed  from the Blankeney Buoy. A contemporary news account reported that Rosalie had been beached, but was apparently irreparably damaged; all her crew, however, was saved.

On 11 August, one day after sinking Rosalie, Steinbrinck and the crew of UB-10 bettered their 30 June activities by sinking ten fishing smacks off Cromer. All ten ships, which ranged in size from 41 to 62 tons, were boarded and sunk by explosives. With these ten ships, the August tally for Steinbrinck and UB-10 was 7,309 tons, which accounted for nearly all of the 7,709 tons sunk by Flanders Flotilla boats that month. In addition, counting the ships sunk at the end of July, UB-10 sank 23 ships in a 13-day span, nearly half the 55 ships sunk by the flotilla in both July and August.

End of the first submarine offensive 
On 18 August, the chief of the Admiralstab, Admiral Henning von Holtzendorff, issued orders suspending the first offensive. The suspension was in response to American demands after German submarines had sunk the Cunard Line steamer  in May 1915, along with other high-profile sinkings in August and September. Holtzendorff's directive ordered all U-boats out of the English Channel and the South-Western Approaches and required that all submarine activity in the North Sea be conducted strictly along prize regulations. UB-10 did not sink another ship for the next four months.

On 20 December, UB-10 sank the last two ships under Steinbrinck's command. The 512-ton Belford and the 1,153-ton Huntly were both torpedoed off Boulogne; there were no casualties on Belford, but two men on Huntly died in the attack. The Huntly was the former German hospital ship Ophelia, which had been seized by English naval forces and renamed the previous year.

On 13 January 1916, Steinbrinck was succeeded by Oblt.z.S. Reinhold Saltzwedel in command of UB-10. Steinbrinck, who went on to command three more U-boats during the war—, and —continued the successes he had in command of UB-10. He was fifth among the top-scoring German submarine commanders of the war, with a tally of 210,000 tons of shipping to his credit. Saltzwedel, Steinbrinck's 26-year-old replacement, was an eight-year veteran of the Kaiserliche Marine and a first-time U-boat commander.

Second submarine offensive 
By early 1916, the British blockade of Germany was beginning to have an effect on Germany and her imports. The Royal Navy had stopped and seized more cargo destined for Germany than the quantity of cargo sunk by German U-boats in the first submarine offensive. As a result, the German Imperial Navy began a second offensive against merchant shipping on 29 February. The final ground rules agreed upon by the German Admiralstab were that all enemy vessels in Germany's self-proclaimed war zone would be destroyed without warning, that enemy vessels outside the war zone would be destroyed only if armed, and—to avoid antagonizing the United States—that enemy passenger steamers were not to be attacked, regardless of whether in the war zone or not.

UB-10s first victim in the new offensive (and Saltzwedel's first as a commander), came on 19 March when the U-boat torpedoed Port Dalhousie, a 1,744-ton Canadian steamer,  from the Kentish Knock Lightvessel. Nineteen men on the ship—headed from Middlesbrough to Nantes with a cargo of steel billets—were lost in the attack; the mate, a pilot, and five crewmen were rescued. About two weeks later, UB-10 torpedoed and sank the Norwegian steamer Peter Hanre in nearly the same location; fourteen men on the 1,081-ton cargo ship were lost. Near the end of April 1916, Admiral Reinhardt Scheer, the newest commander-in-chief of the High Seas Fleet, called off the merchant shipping offensive and ordered all boats at sea to return, and all boats in port to remain there. Port Dalhousie and Peter Hanre were the only ships sunk by UB-10 during the six-week offensive.

Grand Fleet ambush attempts 
In mid-May, Scheer completed plans to draw out part of the British Grand Fleet. The German High Seas Fleet would sortie for a raid on Sunderland, luring the British fleet across nests' of submarines and mine-fields". This group was to intercept and attack the British light forces from Harwich, should they sortie north to join the battle. Unfortunately for the Germans, the British Admiralty had intelligence reports of the departure of the submarines which, coupled with an absence of attacks on shipping, aroused British suspicions.

A delayed departure of the German High Seas Fleet for its sortie (which had been redirected to the Skagerrak) and the failure of several of the U-boats stationed to the north to receive the coded message warning of the British advance caused Scheer's anticipated ambush to be a "complete and disappointing failure". UB-10 sighted the Harwich forces, but they were too far away to mount an attack. The failure of the submarine ambush to sink any British capital ships allowed the full Grand Fleet to engage the numerically inferior High Seas Fleet in the Battle of Jutland, which took place 31 May – 1 June.

After Saltzwedel, UB-10 was assigned a new commander about every two to three months through the end of the war. Saltzwedel's immediate replacement on UB-10 was Kapitänleutnant (Kptlt.) Gustav Buch, who led the boat in sinking her only warship, the British destroyer  on 13 August; Lassoo was torpedoed off the Maas Lightvessel and sank with the loss of six men. Later in August, UB-10 was fortunate enough to avoid attack by a British submarine when departing Zeebrugge. On the morning of 21 August, the outbound UB-10 had a rendezvous with the homeward-bound UC-10 off the North Hinder Lightship and exchanged information.

Unrestricted submarine warfare 
Since the early stages of the war, the Royal Navy had blockaded Germany, preventing neutral shipping from reaching German ports. By the time of the so-called "turnip winter" of 1916–17, the blockade had severely limited imports of food and fuel into Germany. Among the results were an increase in infant mortality and as many as 700,000 deaths attributed to starvation or hypothermia during the war. With the blockade having such dire consequences, Kaiser Wilhelm II personally approved a resumption of unrestricted submarine warfare to begin on 1 February 1917 to help force the British to make peace. The new rules of engagement specified that no ship was to be left afloat.

Under these new rules of engagement, UB-10, now under the command of Kptlt. Erich von Rohrscheidt, first sank the Dutch steamer Amstelstromm on 27 March.

As UB-10 was returning to Zeebrugge in early April, she was attacked by a British submarine near the area where she had escaped from  the previous August. , which had been waiting off the Schouwen gas buoy, launched a torpedo at a U-boat at 03:30 on 5 April. Although authors R. H. Gibson and Maurice Prendergast report that C7 sank  with that torpedo, C7 had in fact fired upon UB-10, and the explosion noted by C7 was her own torpedo prematurely exploding; UB-10 was able to continue on and make port in Zeebrugge.

On 20 August, UB-10—with Oblt.z.S. Fritz Gregor at the helm—sank Edernian, a British vessel,  from Southwold. The 3,588-ton ship, sent down with her cargo of steel and 14 of her crew, was the second largest sunk by UB-10. Early the next month, Gregor led the boat in sinking three more fishing vessels: the Belgian Jeannot and the British Unity on the 5th; and the British Rosary on the 6th. These were the last ships sunk by UB-10.

Conversion to minelayer 
The conversion involved removing the bow section containing the pair of torpedo tubes from each U-boat and replacing it with a new bow containing four mine chutes capable of carrying two mines each. Exactly when this conversion was performed on UB-10 is not reported, but UB-12 was converted in late 1916.

From late February to mid-May 1918, UB-10 was commanded by Oblt.z.S. Hans Joachim Emsmann.

During other raids, considerable damage to harbour facilities delayed repairs and impaired the flotilla's ability to operate at full strength. Although sources do not indicate whether the damage to UB-10s was repaired after this attack or not, by early September the boat was considered unfit for service and was decommissioned on the 12th.

After the Meuse-Argonne Offensive started on 26 September and the Allies began to drive back the German lines, plans were made to evacuate Flanders and dismantle the naval facilities at Bruges, Zeebrugge, and Ostend. All the vessels that were seaworthy were ordered to depart Flanders for Germany on 1 October; those unable to make the journey under their own power were to be destroyed. UB-10 was one of four U-boats left behind. On 5 October, a maintenance crew scuttled UB-10 off the Zeebrugge Mole at position .

Summary of raiding history

Notes

References

Bibliography 

 

 
 
 
 
 
 
 
 
 
 

German Type UB I submarines
Ships built in Bremen (state)
Ships built in Belgium
1915 ships
U-boats commissioned in 1915
World War I submarines of Germany
U-boats scuttled in 1918
Maritime incidents in 1918
World War I shipwrecks in the North Sea